Iris Ann West-Allen (née West), is a fictional character in The CW's Arrowverse franchise, first introduced in the 2014 pilot episode of television series The Flash. The character is based on the DC Comics character of the same name, created by Robert Kanigher and Carmine Infantino. Iris West-Allen has been continually portrayed by Candice Patton.

In the series, Iris is initially a barista studying journalism, portrayed as a smart investigator, who falls in love with a speedster superhero, nicknamed by her The Streak, later The Flash. When she was younger, her father told her that her mother, Francise, died in an accident, but it was turned out she had left her, due to having a drug addiction. She later found out that her adoptive brother, Barry Allen, was The Flash, and went on to work with him and his team in S.T.A.R. Labs, eventually falling in love with him. In the first three seasons, she has the role of only the love interest for the protagonist, but in later seasons she upgraded her role.

Patton has appeared as Iris West-Allen in crossovers on the television series Arrow, Legends of Tomorrow, Supergirl, and Batwoman, all set within the Arrowverse. The character has also appeared in a digital comic book series and tie-ins.

Concept and creation 
Iris West was first introduced in the DC Comics, as a supporting character and the main love interest and later wife of Barry Allen, the alter ego of the Silver Age version of the superhero The Flash, first appearing in Showcase #4 on October 4, 1956. On television, she has appeared in various adaptations in other media; the character has been portrayed by Paula Marshall in the 1990 CBS television series as a guest star, in animation she appears in Young Justice voiced by Nicole Dubuc. She has also appeared in the animated film Justice League: The New Frontier voiced by Vicki Lewis, next in the animated film Justice League: The Flashpoint Paradox voiced by Jennifer Hale, and the animated film Justice Society: World War II, voiced by Ashleigh LaThrop. She has appeared in the live-action film, in the DC Extended Universe's Zack Snyder's Justice League, portrayed by Kiersey Clemons, who was also supposed to appear in Justice League, but her scenes were cut.

Characterization 
Candice Patton was cast as Iris West-Allen on The CW show The Flash, in February 2014. Her casting process was characterized by her, as "surreal", as she auditioned for the role in December 2013, and didn't hear from the production until January of the next year, assuming she wasn't picked. She had also expressed interest in appearing in Gotham, due to her favorite superhero being Batman. She has mentioned that her character is not based on the comics, but she had studied them to prepare for the role. With her casting she described the character as "passionate" and adding that the triangle between Barry, her, and Rick Cosnett's Eddie Thawne, was "very complicat[ing]". Patton said that she was proud that a black actress was portraying such a significant role, with her being a role model to young people, and normalizing interracial relations, while supporting the decision of race-changing, made by the showrunners. She has described her role as strong, fearless, passionate and emotional, with Iris having strength in vulnerability. She took inspiration from fellow actresses, Halle Berry and Zoe Saldaña, and politician Hillary Clinton, with highliting the fact that Iris is not a side character in the show. Throughout the show, her dressing style changing, showcasing her maturing, and becoming a leader. Patton expressed her view that the scheduling of the show is hard, and every year the storylines are getting bigger and more complex, with her being more nervous everytime the show restarts production, as a resulting, consuming more caffeine than she normally would. The actress also said that during the first three seasons, Iris and Grant Gustin's character were in conflict, and she was happy that their relationship's nature changed afterwards. When asked about how hard was to play a different version of her character, she said that she tried to stay close to the original one, and had to improvize in some instances, with her taking this version as a more tough person and protective over her in-show husband. The moment when her character learnt that its version was married to Barry Allen, she knew she had to show to the viewers that Iris was developing romantic feelings for him. For season 2, she found it interesting that Iris was starting to grow her relationship with her editor, but they were never meant to be together. When asked about her relationship with her fictional brother, Keiynan Lonsdale's Wally West, she responded by saying that "Iris is just going to continue to try to support Wally and help him find his place in the West family. And hopefully try to bridge a relationship between him and Barry. She'll help Wally discover who he really is". For season 4, she said that Iris had a responsibility to take up the role of her husband, after he vanished in the Speed Force, while also being depressed and sad that Barry's gone, as she doesn't know when or if he will return, but also angry, for him leaving her. She also added that her and Barry have no secrets anymore, and Iris is ready to face bigger threats. For the episode Run, Iris, Run, where the character gets Flash's powers, Patton said that "It's a complete role reversal [...] And the team trusting in her and her stepping out from behind the console and being a leader in a different way.", with executive producer Helbing adding that "[She's] using everything she's learned, plus Barry's expertise. But we really wanted to have this dynamic when they flop places where she really gets to know what it's like for Barry when he goes out there, and Barry gets to know what it's like for her". Patton, after watching Wonder Woman, appreciated the decision of giving powers to Iris even further. For her wedding scene on the crossover event, Crisis on Earth-X, she picked her wedding dress on her own. For season 5, when asked about its themes, she responded by saying that it is about legacy and family, especially due to the presence of Jessica Parker Kennedy's character, Nora West-Allen / XS. When asked about the CC Citizen, she said that it was made to showcase the leadership skills of Iris, but also to show the power of women. For season 6, Patton has stated that Iris was dealing with the death of Nora, and try to heal, while she has expressed interest into building her relationship with other members of the Team Flash. In 2022, she revealed that she had mood swings on set, due to her lack of vitamin D. About her absence from four episodes of season 8, she said that when negotiating her contract, she wanted to be able to get back to her home in the United States if the COVID-19 pandemic worsened, and she wasn't able to cross the Canada–United States border.

Differences from the comics 

The origin story of Iris West-Allen has been updated for the show, although many writers have taken upon the development of the character throughout its sixty-six years of existence in the comic books. In the comics, Iris works as a reporter for Picture News, based in Central City, and is the fiancée of Barry Allen, and discovers her husband's secret on their wedding night when Barry talks in his sleep. She is also born in the 30th century. In the New 52 rebooted DC Comics continuity, she is not married to Barry, although the two have romantic interest to each other. She is caucasian, and red-headed. In the show, she is black, although she dyed her hair red. She is also not from the future, and her father is named Joe West, not Ira West. Also, Iris never had lived with Barry in the comics growing up, and she never had Wally West as her younger brother, but as her cousin. In the show, Wally and Iris have issues between them, due to them never growing up together, and have to make up the lost time, something that is not the case as Wally is a good member of the West family. Her relationship with Eddie Thawne is non-existent in the comics. The organization Central City Citizen, that she heads from season 6 of the show, doesn't exist in the main continuity, only in the Flashpoint one, and was adopted mainly for the needs of the character's development. In the crossover event comic book, Crisis on Infinite Earths, she died during the Anti-Monitor attack to the Multiverse, something that happened too in the Arrowverse's event of Crisis on Infinite Earths. The job of a reporter is also kept from the comics, with the difference of her laddering up to the position of Editor-In-Chief. In the comics, neither her adoptive, Nadine, nor her biological, Fran, mother left her, or died from MacGregor's Syndrome, something that happened in the eleventh episode, titled "The Reverse-Flash Returns", of the second season of the show. In the comics she dresses more stylish, like Audrey Hepburn, and in the show she has a modern clothing choices.CBR.com has noted that both of the versions have leadership abilities, that shined especially during the third season of the show. In the second mentioned season, the event of Flashpoint is presented, but in the comic books Iris is a working journalist, cooperating with her nephew and cameraman, Wally West. In the show's events, she is aiding Wally in his Flash activities, although the fact that she doesn't know Barry is the same. Another similarity is that their children, although having different names as in the comics they are named Dawn and Don Allen and in the show they are named Nora West-Allen / XS, after Barry's deceased mother, and Bart Allen / Impulse, in both versions have superpowers inherited by their father, that of superspeed. It is noteworthy the fact that Bart is actually the grandson of Iris, and not the son, as he is the son of Don.

Fictional character biography

Early life 
Iris was born on June 24, 1989, to Joe and Francine West in Central City. When she was around six years old, her mother nearly overdosed on pills while Joe was at work. While Joe and his partner drove to the house, the stove caught fire since Francine had left the oven on. Iris was almost killed, but thankfully both were saved. Despite that, Joe told Iris that her mother had died. In reality, Francine was a drug addict who had left them but Joe didn't want his daughter to grow up believing that she'd been abandoned. Instead, he told Iris stories of the mother he knew she deserved, not the mother Francine really was. However, both Iris and Joe were unaware that Francine was pregnant with another child - a son- when she left them. At Carmichael Elementary, she met Barry Allen and the two became best friends. On March 18, 2000, when she was 11 years old, her friend's mother was murdered, and his father was wrongfully convicted. Afterwards, her father brought him to their house, and raised him with her.

Losing her fiancée 

Iris and Barry went to the activation of the S.T.A.R Labs Particle Accelerator, which failed and exploded. That night, a lightning bolt struck Barry and fell into a comma for nine months. During this time, she formed a romantic relationship with Eddie Thawne, his colleague at the CCPD. She also found a job as a waitress at the CC Jitters. Over the weeks, Iris discovered that a superhuman figure was active in Central City. She became determined to discover who he was. At some point, she was kidnapped by a metahuman, Tony Woodward / Girder, but was saved by the superhero. That event inspired her to start a blog, documenting the activities of the superhero, she later named "The Flash". Her faith to him was emporarily broken when he was affected by the criminal metahuman Roy Bivolo / Rainbow Raider that caused The Flash to rage out as he attacked Eddie. The Arrow saved him, and later The Flash met with Iris to explain himself to her. Later, Eddie gave a key to his house to her, and the two started to live together. At some point, Barry confused his feelings towards her, something that left her in sock. She began working for Central City Picture News, as a junior reporter. On Christmas Day at a party at Joe's house, she started discovering she also had feelings for Barry. She tried to sabotage his relations with her fellow reporter, Linda Park, but was confronted by him, telling to her that he doesn't have feelings for her after that. While confused and angry by Barry's bizarre mood swings, Caitlin Snow tricked her into believing Barry was suffering from brain damage. At one point, Eddie was about to propose to her, but were attacked by Eobard Thawne / Reverse Flash. The speedster was about to kill her, but was saved by The Flash. At this moment, she realized the hero was Barry. Iris talked to Barry about it, and agreed to join his team. While Eddie was captured by Reverse Flash, she was nervous, until he was released. Eddie met with her and revealed her that they were never supposed to marry, something his future relative revealed to him. During the final battle between The Flash and Reverse Flash, Eddie shot himself on the chest, killing himself and araising his future relative. Iris cried as she was telling how proud of him she was.

Confronting her past 

Iris went on with her reporting career, trying to cope with the death of her fiancée. At some point, Joe sat her down and confessed that her mother was a drug addict and told her what happened, and that she was alive. Reluctantly, Iris and her father went to see her in a hospital. Iris didn't believe she was dying, but not only she found it was true, but also she had a brother, named Wally West. She later visited Francine again and confronted her about this and told her to leave and never return, also telling her to never tell Joe about Wally. Around Christmas time Iris, unable to keep Wally's existence a secret anymore, confessed her secret to Barry who encouraged her to tell Joe, offering to help her. She eventually told him, but that night he arrived at their doorstep. Wally and Iris talked and fixed their relations, but was hard for Joe to do at first. As part of Team Flash, she found out she was married to Barry, on Earth-2, worming her feeling about him. When Hunter Zolomon / Zoom was defeated, Barry, as he lost his father by him, kissed her and asked her permission to travel back in time to save his mother, something Iris agreed to.

Stopping her future death 

After Barry's actions, a new timeline was created, in which he never became The Flash, but Wally did instead. With the help of Iris, they were protecting the city. When Wally was seriously injured by Edward Clariss / Rival, Barry reseted the timeline. In the post-Flashpoint timeline, Iris continued to hold a grudge against her father for not telling her that her mother was still alive and as a result doesn't speak with him. She also did not share a kiss with Barry prior to him creating Flashpoint. She however remains a member of Team Flash. After learning of Flashpoint, she began to patch things up with her father and finally starts up a relationship with Barry, with the two engaging. At some point, a new speedster, Savitar, was battling Barry, but accidentally went to the future, where he saw Iris getting killed by him. After it was revealed Savitar was a future evil time remanent of Barry, she was sent to Earth-2, being protected by Harry Wells, while Team Flash was trying to change the future. Iris was eventually kidnapped by Savitar and Caitlin Snow / Killer Frost, with H.R. Wells, disguised as her, found her took her place, with him being killed instead of her. After Barry got Savitar to S.T.A.R. Labs, he and Iris were willing to negate his erasure from existence, but he ultimately rejected the offer. At the final battle between Team Flash and Savitar, he was defeated, and killed, shot by Iris to save Barry. After the fight, the personification of the Speed Force appeared and took Barry to fix it.

Marriage to Barry Allen 

In Barry's absence she became the leader of Team Flash. Cisco Ramon / Vibe revealed to Iris that he and many of the technological allies of Team Flash had helped him to release Barry from the Speed Force, while Caitlin returned to the team, albeit not without being scolded by Iris. They opened a portal, but it appeared elsewhere, over a bus, but they found him and brought him to S.T.A.R. Labs, with him being insane. When she was abducted by a Samuroid, Barry became sane again and saved her.

After a while, Barry proposed to her, and the two decided to marry. When they were about to marry, the church was assaulted by Nazis, from Earth-X. Barry and Iris decided to put the wedding off until later. Iris and Felicity Smoak tried to break out some of the people who were the meta-dampening cells, but it didn't work. So, they sent an SOS to the Legends of Tomorrow. When Kara Danvers / Supergirl heart was going to be cut out, Felicity and she turned of S.T.A.R. Lab's power in an attempt to save Kara, but failed. Luckily, the Legends arrived on time to fight the Nazis and rescued them. After the invasion failed, she married with Barry, simultaneously with Oliver Queen / Green Arrow and Felicity, by John Diggle / Spartan.

Afterwards, they enjoyed their honeymoon. At some point, Clifford DeVoe / Thinker kidnapped Barry in front of her, while Caitlin was kidnapped by Amunet Black at approximately the same time. S.T.A.R. Lab satellite was unable to find them, Iris had to choose who to find first. This proved difficult for her, but ultimately, since Caitlin was in a more vulnerable situation than Barry, she decided to rescue her first and had all resources dedicated to finding Caitlin. Cisco and Dibny were able to rescue her, and Barry managed to escape from DeVoe by himself. DeVoe framed the murder of a person to Barry, and was sent to trial. During his trial, he talked Iris off, of revealing his secret identity to save him. Barry was sentenced to a life imprisonment without parole. Later, with Ralph's help, Iris managed to clear Barry and he was released from prison. The team encountered a metahuman, who swapped the DNA of Barry and Iris, making her a speedster, but were able to reverse it. DeVoe's plan was eventually unsuccessful. After the battle, Team Flash celebrated, but they were interrupted when Barry's and Iris' future daughter, Nora West-Allen / XS appeared, from 2049.

Losing her future daughter 

Nora revealed that she went back in time to meet Barry because she never got to know him in the future but her arrival had caused some problems in the present. Barry and the team eventually decided to let her stay and be a part of the team. Iris tried to build a relationship with her daughter, but Nora didn't want to, because in the future she saw her as a bad parent.

As a result of the Monitor gave the Book of Destiny to John Deegan, he rewrote reality so that Barry was the Green Arrow, and Oliver was The Flash. Iris, at first, didn't believe Barry that he was her true husband, but eventually did. Barry and Oliver managed to fix reality.

Iris learnt that her future self had implanted a power dampener into Nora since infancy to hide her powers. She also discovered her future self, despite being a good mother, hid the fact that Nora's father was The Flash from her. This led to Nora having a negative perception of her mother out of anger and Iris was guilt-ridden by her counterpart's dishonesty. Iris wanted to have a relationship with Nora and to avoid becoming the woman that the latter knew in the future. During this time, she started The Central City Citizen, hiring Kamilla Hwang as a photographer. At some point, Sherloque Wells exposed that Nora was cooperating with Eobard Thawne / Reverse Flash, who was imprisoned in the future. Iris disagreed with Barry on what to do with her, but Barry sent her back to the future. Iris, with the help of Ralph, went to 2049, and she confronted Thawne. After Team Flash defeated Orlin Dwyer / Cicada, she and the Team went to the future and defeated Thawne, although Nora was araised from existence due to the timeline changing.

Multiversal Crisis 

After the death of Nora, she and Barry tried to cope with it, despite their anticipation that a version of her might be born in their future. Keeping her promise to Nora, Iris vowed to support her yet-to-be born daughter to become XS. She struggled on keeping The Central City Citizen running, and hired Allegra Garcia as a reporter. Meanwhile, she was trying to distract Barry from his fate dying in Crisis.

When the Crisis began, the Monitor informed the heroes that there are seven individuals known as Paragons, who can defeat the Anti-Monitor. She, Lois Lane, and Clark Kent / Superman, went to search the Multiverse for the Paragon of Truth. They first traveled to Earth-75, learning that Lex Luthor from her universe, using the Book of Destiny, was killing Supermen. After that they visit Earth-167, where they meet with that universe's Clark Kent, but Lex, using the Book, kicks them from that Earth. The trio goes to Earth-96, where they meet the editor-in-chief of the Daily Planet, Clark Kent, who had suffered the loss of all of the people he cared for, thus making him the Paragon of Truth. In that moment Luthor appeared, using the Book, forcing Earth-96 Clark to attack Clark. They fight, but Lois knocked Lex out, thus Earth-96 Clark came back to his senses. Clark, Lois, Iris and Earth-96 Clark then returned to the Waverider, to join the other heroes, with her reuniting with Barry. With the team's best efforts failing, the Multiverse is consumed by anti-matter. Then, a mind-controlled by the Anti-Monitor Lyla Michaels / Harbinger appeared on the ship, killing the Monitor. Nash Wells / Pariah then sends the Paragons to the Vanishing Point, though her, Clark, Lois, John Diggle / Spartan, Jefferson Pierce / Black Lightning and Ralph are consumed by anti-matter. After the fight between the Paragons with the Anti-Monitor and his forces result into victory for the first mentioned, Oliver, now a cosmic being called the Spectre, restarts the Multiverse, combining Earth-1, Earth-38, and Jefferson's Earth forming Earth-Prime, restoring everyone to life, including her.

After Crisis, she resumed her reporting activities, investigating stolen prototype guns from McCulloch Technologies. Iris thought that behind the events, and the killings of former McCulloch employees, was the vanished Eva McCulloch's husband, Joseph Carver. To gain more information, she broke into McCulloch Technologies, and was taken to the Mirrorverse by Eva McCulloch. She was jailed in the Mirrorverse, with a mirror duplicate taking her place. She was kept there for a long time, until Eva revealed to Barry she was behind everything, and he was able to save her. After returning to Earth, she tried to remain detached from her experiences in the Mirrorverse, but Allegra advised her as Iris' editor that people wanted to know the truth about had happened to her in the other dimension, and so she wrote an article about it.

Dealing with her husband's superhero life 

Barry, as the Paragon of Love, asked her to help him reborn the Speed Force. Iris did, and was successful, but they also created other forces, the Still Force, the Strength Force, and the Sage Force. Eventually, the Speed Force, in the form of Barry's mother, Nora Allen, visited to presumably thank them for bringing her back, but also for help, due to the other forces attacking her. She investigated the forces, and found that the host of the Sage Force was Bashir Adil Malik, and with the Strength Force's host, Alexa, went to S.T.A.R. Labs, but "Nora" attacked, and was tricked she killed them, but it was an illusion, cast by Bashir. Barry managed to reason "Nora", and she left.

Sometime later, a confused memory-damaged August Heart / Godspeed arrived from 2049. Iris developed a timesickness, and was taken into the Still Force by its host, Deon Owens, to help her. Dazens of Godspeed clones attacked Central City to find August, but with the help of her future son, Bart Allen / Impulse, daughter, Nora West-Allen / XS, Jay Garrick / The Flash, the Speed Force, and her with speedster powers defeated them. After that, Iris with "Nora" brought back Eobard Thawne / Reverse Flash, and Barry with his help defeated August. Afterwards, she and Barry renewed their wedding vows.

Armageddon and Reverse Flashpoint 

Six months after the renewal of her wedding vows with Barry, she took an interview from Ray Palmer at the Central City Technology Convention. The interview was cut short, after the attack of an alien from the future, Despero, but Ray and Barry managed to defeat him. Iris and Team Flash start searching for information about the alien, contacting Alex Danvers / Sentinel of the Department of Extranormal Operations, with her not having anything valuable. Despero then appeared and revealed to Barry that he was coming from 2031, and he was the reason for the world's destruction, referring to it as Armageddon. Iris talked to Barry, and assured him that he would never do something like that. That day, Barry asked where is Joe, with Iris telling him that he was dead. Barry ran to Jefferson Pierce / Black Lightning for help, with Iris and the Team trying to find his location to help him. After Despero found Barry's location, he traveled to 2031 to uncover what happened, and to his surprise, learns that Eobard Thawne / Reverse Flash had changed the timeline so that he was The Flash, leader of Team Flash, and soon-to-be husband to Iris, while Barry was the Reverse-Flash and was part of the Legion of Doom with Damien Darhk where the group killed some superheroes. In the Reverse-Flashpoint timeline, Iris and Ryan Wilder / Batwoman talk about her marriage to Thawne, and what she wants from life. Afterwards, Barry appeared in her house, and talked her into believing that he was the real Flash, with her stopping Thawne from killing him. When Barry was running at super-speeds, he sought Iris' help to run faster, through their Paragon of Love connection, and Barry successfully changed the timeline as it was before, with Joe being alive. But, Thawne managed to escape, and was eventually captured by Barry, with him seeking to help him not get araised from existence. Iris and Barry argued not to save him, but Joe convinced them to save him. Due to Thawne's actions, Mia Queen / Green Arrow appeared from the future and taken to S.T.A.R. Labs. She and Iris had a conversation about the future, and Iris advised her to not become like her father. Eventually, Barry defeated Despero, and saved Thawne. Later, Iris and the Team went to celebrate their victory.

Dealing with her time sickness

Alternate versions

Earth-2 

A version of the character, residing on Earth-2, is seen in the second season of The Flash. Her universe was destroyed during the Crisis on Infinite Earths. She was studying journalism, and when her boyfriend, Barry Allen, went to get his PhD, she quit her internship and became a cop to help pay for his tuition. At some point, the two married. She was a policewoman, investigating Hunter Zolomon / Zoom. When Barry Allen / The Flash of Earth-1 arrived to her world, she didn't notice, as he took her husband's place to search for information on Zoom. That night they went to Jitterbugs Joe West's singing show. Then, Caitlin Snow / Killer Frost and Ronnie Raymond / Deathstorm stormed the place, with Deathstorm accidentally shooting a fireball at Joe, hospitalizing him. Later, he died, with Iris feeling guilty she couldn't save her father. After getting a lead on their location, she went after them. She was eventually saved by The Flash. The next day, Barry of Earth-1 revealed to her he was from another universe, and wanted help for the saving of Jesse Wells, Harry Wells daughter. After helping him, she and her Barry left for Atlantis, to escape Zoom. In late 2019, her world was destroyed from an anti-matter wave.

Earth-90 

A version of the character, residing on Earth-90 portrayed by Paula Marshall, was a computer graphic artist and the ex-girlfriend of Barry Allen. In 1990, she broke up with Barry due to him being not interested in their relationship. She was killed when the Monitor invaded their world, using the Book of Destiny.

Mirrorverse 

A version of the character, which was created by Eva McCulloch, from the dimension of Mirrorverse, after the kidnapping of Iris West-Allen. She is often referred to as Mirror Iris. She assumed the role of the original Iris West-Allen and filled in the blanks with Barry Allen on the real Iris's disappearance. At a dinner with Barry, they were attacked by Amunet Black, telling them to not interfere with her activities. She joined Amunet's business against Barry's wishes, but failed to take her down on her own, calling Barry for help, to also stop Goldface. Though she was able to get the mirror gun from Joe West, she didn't extract any information about Joseph Carver. When Wally returned, she had to fake knowing him, but Wally told Barry that he had a weird feeling about her. At some point, Kamilla Hwang took a picture of her that was showing she was a mirror clone, and Iris had to send her to the Mirrorverse, bringing a mirror clone of her to be replaced with. Later, Iris and Kamila went to interview Tina McGee, at Mercury Labs, but their true goal was to retrieve a prismatic refractor. As they were about to escape, Millie Rawlins / Sunshine attacked them, but Barry intervened saving them. After learning that Joe went to witness protection, due to an assassination attempt, she uses it as the reason to kick Barry out of their apartment, with the goal of weakening him. She, Kamilia, and a mirror clone of David Singh, went to Ramsey Rosso / Bloodwork and took blood sample from him, to use it to bring Eva back from the Mirrorverse. Upon Barry realizing that, he went to her apartment and the two fought, with her mirror glass, though, telekenisis, to wound him. When she realized that she was a mere tool of Eva, she decided to be self-destroyed.

Unnamed Earth 

A version of the character, residing on an unnamed Earth portrayed by Kiersey Clemons, is seen when Barry Allen saves her from a traffic accident, using his superspeed.

Appearances 

Candice Patton has appeared in five out the seven Arrowverse TV series:
 The character was first mentioned in the Arrow episode titled The Man Under the Hood, of season 2, while she was inderictly mentioned in the episode Three Ghosts of the same show, by Barry Allen.
 She made her first appearance in the show, The Flash, where she is also among the main protagonists.
 From the total one hundred and seventy episodes of The Flash, as of 2022, the character has not physically appeared in eight of them, with them being The Exorsism of Nash Wells of season 6, where she was trapped in the Mirrorverse, Rayo de Luz and Enemy At the Gates of season 7, and Into the Still Force of season 8. She also did not make appearances until Negative, Part One.
 Patton made appearances in the Crisis on Earth-X, and Crisis on Infinite Earths, with the shows being Supergirl, Arrow, Batwoman and Legends of Tomorrow.

Reception

Critical response 

Patton was cast as Iris West on The CW show The Flash, in 2014. Her casting was met with mixed feelings, due to her being a black actress, and the role she was going to portray was white and red-headed in the comics. According to website Fansided, Patton changed the way Hollywood viewed black women, and seemed to influence further race swaps of other characters, such as the Iris West that appeared in DC Extended Universe's Zack Snyder's Justice League, portrayed by Kiersey Clemons, the Marvel Cinematic Universe's Spider-Man: Homecoming, MJ, portrayed by Zendaya, and the casting of Leslie Grace as Barbara Gordon / Batgirl in the DCEU film, Batgirl. Web site TV Guide mentioned that in earlier seasons of The Flash, it seemed like Patton's character was colorblind, and wasn't acting like a black person. But, in season 6 "she was allowed to be a more authentic version of herself when she rocked her natural curls". Patton has been victim to racist attacks by fans of the show, due to her playing a white character, with fellow co-start Grant Gustin saying on his personal Instagram account "Our Iris is an African American actress [...] and she always is gonna be [...] she will continue to play her [role], and I have her back and will have her back". Patton has been experiencing this phenomenon from the day of her casting, and many fans have noted that The CW didn't take an official stand, until a 2020 Twitter post made by the official account of the network indirectly mentioning her too. Fans quickly went to support the actress, and attack the network. According to website Decider, she was the highlight of DC FanDome event. The Looper noted that the scene of season 6 "Marathon", where Iris, trapped in the Mirrorverse, was touching hands with her husband, Barry, without him seeing her, was her best in the show's run.

Some fans, although, have noted the due to her being a successful journalist, her character looked like a combination of Lois Lane and Linda Park, both reporters in DC comics. Fans also have criticized the way her character was written, with some suggesting that she doesn't deserve the hate, because it is up to the writers on how to portray her. The moment that sparked the most controversy was when in a scene of the second episode of season 4, titled "Mixed Feelings", during an emotional moment with Barry, she said to him that "We are the Flash", implementing that together make up the hero. The line was met with an outrage from fans, with the website Discussing Films noting that the bad feelings that were created, continued to follow the character's reputation throughout the rest of the show, but adding that the hero was always more than one person in the show. For season 7, the PTSD she experienced in the Mirrorverse was never explored, and was forgotten, being described as "a let down" by critics. Many fans have argued that the show is not giving the feeling of a duo, between Iris and Barry, something that is the case with Clark Kent and Lois Lane in the connected show Superman & Lois. According to Collider, Patton's character was treated unfairly in season 8, and was characterized by the website as a "plot point", while noting that her death in Negative, Part One did not have any gravite or impact. The mentioned website has placed the Barry-Iris couple as the fourth best of the Arrowverse. Patton as Iris has received positive reviews and from critics, with The Flash being the most watched show in The CW history.

Accolades 
All awards and nominations are for Patton's performance as Iris West-Allen in The Flash:

Other media 
In January 2022, it was announced that a six-issue event series titled Earth-Prime would be released over the span of three months. The first five issues would focus on stories from every show of the franchise, with the last being a crossover event. Earth-Prime #5 was scheduled to be released on May 3, 2022, focusing on The Flash. The events of the comicbook will be canon to the Arrowverse.

She has appeared in The Flash: Season Zero, a comic tie-in prequel to the events of the show, appearing in seven of the issues.

Notes

References

External links 
 Iris West-Allen on Fandom
 Iris West on DC database

American female characters in television
Crossover characters in television
The Flash (2014 TV series) characters
Fictional reporters
Television characters introduced in 2015